United Methodist Church is a historic church North Washington Street in Millersburg, Ohio. The Methodist Episcopal Church  of Millersburg was built in 1871, replacing an earlier building from 1821. It is a Romanesque Revival style standing two stories high with a slate gable roof.

The exterior has a paired stained glass window under a brick hood mould with brick corbelling.  A stone belt runs between the first floor windows and the second floor windows.  The gable peak is surmounted by a wooden cross on a finial.  The northeast corner supports a buttressed bell tower with a tent roof.  The sanctuary is on the second floor and retains the stained glass windows and a balcony.

It was added to the National Register in 1984.

See also
History of Methodism in the United States

References

United Methodist churches in Ohio
Churches on the National Register of Historic Places in Ohio
Romanesque Revival church buildings in Ohio
Churches completed in 1871
Buildings and structures in Holmes County, Ohio
National Register of Historic Places in Holmes County, Ohio